Droga krajowa nr 58 (translates from Polish as national road 58) – route belonging to Polish national roads network. It runs through Podlaskie and Warmian-Masurian Voivodeships, leading from junction with expressway S51 in Olsztynek through Szczytno, Ruciane-Nida, Pisz and Biała Piska to Szczuczyn where ends on crossing with road 61.

Towns along the route 
 Olsztynek (expressway S7, expressway S51)
 Zgniłocha
 Jedwabno
 Szczytno (national road 53, national road 57)
 Babięta
 Stare Kiełbonki (national road 59)
 Zgon
 Ruciane-Nida
 Pisz (national road 63)
 Biała Piska
 Szczuczyn (national road 61)

58